Al, Allen, Allan or Alan Benson may refer to:

Allan L. Benson (1871–1940), American newspaper editor and author
Allen "Bullet" Benson (1905–1999), American baseball pitcher
Al Benson (1908–1978), American radio DJ and music promoter
Al Benson (basketball) (born 1914), American center in NBL